A Special Day is a 1977 Italian drama film directed by Ettore Scola and starring Sophia Loren, Marcello Mastroianni and John Vernon. Set in Rome in 1938, its narrative follows a woman and her neighbor who stay home the day Adolf Hitler visits Benito Mussolini. It is an Italian-Canadian co-production.

Themes addressed in the film include gender roles, fascism, and the persecution of homosexuals under the Mussolini regime. It received several nominations and awards, including a César Award for Best Foreign Film, a Golden Globe for Best Foreign Language Film, and two Academy Award nominations in 1978. It is featured on the list of the 100 Italian films to be saved.

Plot

On May 4, 1938, the day Hitler visits Mussolini in Rome, Antonietta, a naïve, sentimental and overworked homemaker, stays home doing her usual domestic tasks, while her fascist husband, Emanuele, and their six spoiled children take to the streets to follow a parade. The building is empty, except for the caretaker and a neighbor across the complex, a charming man named Gabriele. He is a radio broadcaster who has been dismissed from his job and is about to be deported to Sardinia because of his homosexuality and alleged anti-fascist stance. After the family's myna escapes from their apartment and flies outside Gabriele's window, Antonietta shows up at his door, asking to be let in to reach the bird. Gabriele has been interrupted from attempting suicide, but helps rescue the myna by offering it food, and is amused by the episode. Antonietta is surprised by his demeanor and, unaware of his sexual orientation, flirts and dances the rumba with him.

Despite their differences, they warm to each other. The caretaker warns Antonietta that Gabriele is an anti-fascist, which Antonietta finds despicable. Gabriele eventually opens up, confessing he was fired because he is a homosexual. Antonietta confides in him her troubles with her arrogant and unfaithful husband; who, she says, has shown a preference for an educated woman. Throughout their interaction and conversation, each realize that the other is oppressed by social and governmental conditioning and come to form a new impression than the one they first drew from one another. As a result, they have sex, but for different reasons. Gabriele explains that this changes nothing; as does Antonietta. (However, later, when her son reminds his mother of all the newspaper clippings she will have from the parade for her album collection, Antonietta's face reveals a look of slight indifference.)  Soon after their intimate encounter, Antonietta's family comes back home and Gabriele is arrested. At the end, Antonietta sits near the window and starts reading a book Gabriele has given to her (The Three Musketeers). She watches as her lover leaves the complex, escorted by fascist policemen, before turning off the light and retiring to bed: Her husband is waiting there for her in order to beget their seventh child, whom he wants to name Adolfo.

Cast

Themes
Much of the film's themes revolve around gender roles and the model of masculinity under fascist Italy. Antonietta is the donna madre, a mother figure who meets her feminine responsibilities in the regime by having six children, boasting one more will secure her the government bonus established for large families in 1933. The Fascist regime equates homosexuality with depopulation, and thus, Gabriele is suspected of treason. The bachelor tax of 1926 was a measure against this, and Gabriele has to pay it. While the stay-at-home mother and homosexual neighbor would seem to be an improbable pairing, both are minimized by the regime, and find comfort and some sympathy in each other. At the end of the film, domestic life will continue as usual, but "inner resistance" to Fascism has been awakened.

Production

Maurizio Costanzo, Ruggero Maccari and Ettore Scola wrote the screenplay, after Maccari had learned about an incident in Fascist Italy in which homosexuals were arrested and taken to Sardinia. Particularly, the story of broadcaster Nunzio Filogamo was an inspiration to the story, as Filogamo always had to carry a certificate stating he was not homosexual.

The actors selected for the roles defied type casting, as Marcello Mastroianni was often seen in previous roles as "the prototype of the Italian Latin lover," and Sophia Loren was perceived as a sexy Italian celebrity.  Along with Il bell'Antonio and I Don't Want to Talk About It, this is one of Mastroianni's roles critiquing the Italian masculine figure as the incompetent character falling behind an evolving society.

Due to the abundance of news coverage of Hitler's visit to Rome in 1938, the filmmakers had plenty of footage to write a screenplay around. The public service film The Führer's Trip to Italy was especially mined for footage. Faced with a lack of funding from Italian producers, the filmmakers persuaded investors in Canada to support the project. Canafox, a company based in Montreal, co-produced.

A number of unusual cinematic techniques are used in this film. A long take scene introduces Antonietta and her family: the camera enters through the kitchen window and moves into the rooms. Deep focus is utilized in a scene in which the camera is in Antonietta's room with her in the frame, and through a distant window Gabriele can simultaneously be seen moving in his house in the same frame. In post production cinematic color grading was applied to the film to give it muted sepia tones throughout.

Release
The film screened at the Cannes Film Festival in May 1977. It also played in New York City in September 1977.

After a restoration by Cineteca Nazionale di Roma and Surf Film, the film was placed in the Venice Classics section in the 2014 Venice Film Festival. In Region 1, The Criterion Collection released the film on Blu-ray on 13 October 2015.

Reception

Critical reception
The film received praise from critics in Italy and throughout Europe on its release. Vincent Canby, writing for The New York Times, appreciated the film's humor and humanity. The New York review states that while the celebrity of Sophia Loren and Marcello Mastroianni would draw audiences in, they were too glamorous to play their characters, and thus, the film did not work.

In 2008, it was featured on the list of the 100 Italian films to be saved, chosen by a jury of film experts for preservation. In 2015, The Hollywood Reporter critic Deborah Young praised it as "one of the most telling films ever made about Italian Fascism," which "suggests a path that cuts through mass-think ideologies, one that anyone can follow with a little human solidarity and courage." Writing for the LGBT-oriented Out, Armond White said the film demonstrated empathy before falling into the mawkish, and Mastroianni was great. Mike D'Angelo of The A.V. Club gave it a B−, saying the film became more powerful through its runtime, although there is less of a story. D'Angelo felt it was positive the sex between the protagonists is not claimed to convert Gabriele to heterosexuality.

Accolades
The film competed for the Palme d'Or in the 1977 Cannes Film Festival, and while its bid was supported by a few festival co-ordinators, juror Roberto Rossellini successfully lobbied for Padre Padrone instead. At the 2014 Venice Film Festival, it won the award for Best Restored Film.

Adaptations
An English-language stage adaptation, titled Working on a Special Day, had its U.S. Premiere in 2013 in an Off-Broadway production from Por Piedad Teatro and The Play Company. Mexican theatre artists Ana Graham and Antonio Vega co-directed and performed the roles of Antonietta and Gabriele, respectively.

See also
 List of submissions to the 50th Academy Awards for Best Foreign Language Film
 List of Italian submissions for the Academy Award for Best Foreign Language Film

References

Bibliography

External links
 
 
 
 A Special Day: Small Victories an essay by Deborah Young at the Criterion Collection

1970s political drama films
1977 LGBT-related films
1977 films
Italian political drama films
1970s Italian-language films
Films about anti-fascism
Best Foreign Film César Award winners
Best Foreign Language Film Golden Globe winners
Films directed by Ettore Scola
Films produced by Carlo Ponti
Films with screenplays by Ruggero Maccari
Films with screenplays by Maurizio Costanzo
Films scored by Armando Trovajoli
Films set in Rome
Films set in 1938
Films about Fascist Italy
Films about fascists
1977 drama films
Films with screenplays by Ettore Scola
1970s Italian films